The 2012–13 season of the Oberliga Baden-Württemberg, the highest association football league in the state of Baden-Württemberg, was the fifth season of the league at tier five (V) of the German football league system and the 35th season overall since establishment of the league in 1978. The regular season started on 11 August 2012 and finished on 25 May 2013.

The league was won by SpVgg Neckarelz which thereby earned promotion to the Regionalliga Südwest for 2013–14. Offenburger FV, FSV 08 Bissingen and FC Singen 04 were relegated to the Verbandsligas. Dejan Bozic of runners-up FC Astoria Walldorf was the top goal scorer with 24 goals. FC Nöttingen's game against TSV Grunbach attracted the most spectators for the season with 2,070 while SSV Reutlingen was the best supported club with an average of 698 spectators per game.

Standings 
The league featured four new clubs with SGV Freiberg and FSV 08 Bissingen promoted from the Verbandsliga Württemberg, FC Singen 04 from the Verbandsliga Südbaden and TSV Grunbach from the Verbandsliga Baden. The Karlsruher SC II had been relegated from the Regionalliga Süd to the Oberliga Baden-Württemberg in the previous season.

Top goalscorers
The top goal scorers for the season:

Promotion play-offs
Promotion play-offs were held at the end of the season to the Oberliga, involving the runners-up of the Verbandsliga Württemberg, Verbandsliga Südbaden and Verbandsliga Baden. In the first round the runners up of Südbaden and Baden met with the winner then taking on the Württemberg runners-up. The latter, FV Ravensburg, won promotion by defeating Baden runners-up SV 98 Schwetzingen 5–1 in the return leg at Schwetzingen:

First round

Second round

References

External links 
 Oberliga Baden-Württemberg on Fupa.net 

Baden
Oberliga Baden-Württemberg seasons